Silvia Biondini (born 24 January 1976) is a retired Italian triple and long jumper.

Career
She finished thirteenth at the 1997 European U23 Championships, sixth at the 2001 Mediterranean Games and seventh at the 2005 Mediterranean Games. She also competed at the 2002 European Championships without reaching the final.

Biondini became Italian champion in 2000 and 2001, and Italian indoor champion in 2001 and 2002. Her personal best jump was 14.15 metres, achieved in July 2001 in Catania.

See also
 Italian all-time lists - Triple jump

References

External links
 

1976 births
Living people
Italian female long jumpers
Italian female triple jumpers
Athletes (track and field) at the 2001 Mediterranean Games
Athletes (track and field) at the 2005 Mediterranean Games
Mediterranean Games competitors for Italy
Sportspeople from Arezzo
21st-century Italian women